Nemesapáti is a village in Zala County, Hungary, Europe.

References

Populated places in Zala County